The 436th Training Squadron is a non-flying training squadron of the United States Air Force. The 436th Training Squadron, located at Dyess Air Force Base, Texas, is a geographically separated unit (GSU) within Air Combat Command’s 552nd Air Control Wing, Tinker AFB, Oklahoma.

The 436th is one of the oldest units in the United States Air Force, first being organized as the 88th Aero Squadron on 18 August 1917 at Kelly Field, Texas. The squadron deployed to France and fought on the Western Front during World War I as a Corps observation squadron.

On 7 December 1941, elements of the 88th Reconnaissance Squadron were one of the Boeing B-17 Flying Fortress units that landed at Hickam Field, Hawaii during the Japanese attack on Pearl Harbor.  Later in World War II as the 436th Bombardment Squadron , the unit earned the Distinguished Unit Citation and the Presidential Unit Citation for its services in the China Burma India Theater (CBI). During the Cold War, it was part of Strategic Air Command equipped with B-52 Stratofortress bombers until its inactivation in 1963.

Mission
The 436th Training Squadron provides formal training to Air Combat Command using 14 classes at Dyess Air Force Base, Texas and 38 other programs exported directly to units for local training needs.

Training includes flight, ground and weapons safety, Air Force operations resource management system, classroom instructor training, Aircrew flight equipment, and computer software use and development. The 436th Training Squadron also develops multimedia and formal presentations used in training program development and formal presentations. Multimedia personnel are based at Dyess and deploy worldwide to perform their mission. Unit products and services are used throughout the Department of Defense.

History

World War I

Activated in the summer of 1917 as the Air Service 88th Aero Squadron; deployed to France during World War I and served on the Western Front.  Engaged in combat as a corps observation squadron with I, III, IV, and V Army Corps, 30 May – 10 November 1918. After the armistice subsequently served with VII Army Corps in the occupation force, November 1918 – May 1919 when the squadron returned to the United States.

Inter-War era
Redesignated as the 88th Squadron in 1921 and assigned to Langley Field, Virginia. Participated in demonstrations of effectiveness of aerial bombardment on warships, June–September 1921. Deployed for service in connection with civil disorders arising from West Virginia coal strike, September 1921.  Redesignated 88th Observation Squadron in 1921 the squadron moved from Langley to support Army ground forces at Fort Campbell, Kentucky; then to Texas in 1927 at Brooks Field to patrol the Mexican Border; to Oklahoma in 1928 to support Fort Sill, then back to Brooks Field in 1931.

Squadron moved to California in 1935 and was assigned to the new Hamilton Field near San Francisco, as part of the 12th Observation Group. Became a coastal patrol squadron operating amphibian aircraft, then began to operate modern Martin B-10 bombers in 1936 in the reconnaissance mission when attached as the fourth squadron of the 7th Bombardment Group, 1st Wing, General Headquarters Air Force.  The squadron dropped food and supplies and flew photographic missions in connection with flood-relief operations in central California, 12–13 December 1937; upgraded to the B-18 Bolo in 1938, and in 1939 to early-model Boeing B-17B Flying Fortress for long range reconnaissance patrols.  Moved to Fort Douglas, Utah in 1940 when the short runways at Hamilton proved inadequate for B-17 operations, with a secondary move to Salt Lake City Army Air Base in January 1941 where it was upgraded to the B-17E.

In October 1941, was ordered to Clark Field, Philippines Commonwealth to build up forces there due to increased tensions between the United States and the Japanese Empire. Due to a lack of planes, some pilots were sent to Seattle to fly new B-17s overseas while the remainder departed on 12 November from Salt Lake City, by train, arriving at Angel Island by ferry; They remained at Angel Island until 20 November, now bound for Hickam Field, Hawaii Territory, on the troopship 'Republic'. The 'Republic' arrived 28 November. After an overnight refueling, they reboarded the 'Republic'; just outside Pearl Harbor they joined a convoy of 13 Freighters and an escort of a light cruiser the "Pensacola" bound for the Philippines, this was also known as the 'Pensacola Convoy'. 7 December they had reached the Equator. Hearing the news of the attack on Pearl Harbor, they changed course, from the Philippines, now re-directed to Brisbane, Australia via Suva, Fiji. The B-17s ended up coming in under attack during their arrival at Hickam on 7 December.  Some of the planes managed to land at Haleiwa Fighter Strip, one set down on a golf course, and the remainder landed at Hickam under the strafing of Japanese planes.

World War II

After the Pearl Harbor Attack, the surviving aircraft operated from Hawaii until February 1942, becoming part of the air defense forces of the Territory.  Moved to Australia with the 7th Bomb Group where the squadron reformed in northern Queensland in late February.  Became part of the new Fifth Air Force.  Moved to Java in the Dutch East Indies an attempt to stop the Japanese advance, however the small force of B-17s could do very little to stem the tide of the Japanese advance, launching valiant but futile attacks against the masses of Japanese shipping and returned to RAAF Townsville in early March.

Redesignated as the 436th Bombardment Squadron in April 1942 and left its B-17Es in Australia, being reassigned to the new Tenth Air Force in India where it was re-equipped with long-range Consolidated B-24D Liberators.  For the balance of the war, carried out long distance heavy bomb raids over Japanese targets primarily in Burma, Thailand and Indochina; a theater with little news coverage, see China Burma India Theater; although also attacked Japanese targets in Southeastern China attacking airfields, fuel and supply dumps, locomotive works, railways, bridges, docks, warehouses, shipping, and troop concentrations in Burma and struck oil refineries in Thailand, power plants in China and enemy shipping in the Andaman Sea.  (A more complete account is available in Lt Col (Ret) William Henderson's book, "From China Burma India to the River Kwai") Ceased bombing operations in late May 1945 and was attached to the Air Transport Command to haul gasoline from India over the Himalayas to China.  Squadron demobilized in India, leaving B-24s to Indian Colonial forces, inactivated as a paper unit in the United States in early 1946.

Strategic Air Command
Reactivated in 1946 as a  B-29 Superfortress bombardment squadron and trained in global bombardment operations  flying simulated bombing missions over various cities, as well as performing intercontinental training missions over the Pacific and later to Europe.  In June 1948 the first Consolidated B-36A Peacekeeper was delivered.  Operated B-36s until 1958 when the squadron began conversion to the B-52 Stratoforterss.

In 1959 was reassigned to SAC provisional 4238th Strategic Wing, being re-equipped with B-52F Stratofortress intercontinental heavy bombers. Was reassigned to Barksdale Air Force Base, Louisiana by SAC to disperse its heavy bomber force.  Conducted worldwide strategic bombardment training missions and providing nuclear deterrent. Was inactivated in 1963 when SAC inactivated its provisional Strategic Wings, redesignating them permanent Air Force Wings.  Squadron was inactivated with aircraft/personnel/equipment being redesignated 20th Bombardment Squadron in an in-place, name-only transfer.

Training operations
Reactivated in as the 436th Strategic Training Squadron at Carswell Air Force Base, Texas to provide training on the Boeing B-52H Stratofortress. The squadron supported the SAC mission through classroom instruction, multimedia production, and training aid fabrication. Due to a realignment of major commands in the Air Force in June 1992, the squadron was reassigned to Air Combat Command and became the 436th Training Squadron. In 1993, the squadron and the 7th Wing moved to Dyess Air Force Base, Texas as Carswell became a joint reserve base.  The squadron continues to provide classroom instruction for over 10 courses to students from every major command and multimedia productions used throughout the Department of Defense.

Lineage
 Organized as the 88th Aero Squadron 18 August 1917
 Redesignated 88th Aero Squadron (Corps Observation) on 28 May 1918
 Redesignated 88th Aero Squadron on 27 June 1919
 Redesignated 88th Squadron (Observation) on 14 March 1921
 Redesignated 88th Observation Squadron' on 25 January 1923
 Inactivated on 1 August 1927
 Activatedon  1 June 1928
 Redesignated 88th Observation Squadron (Long-range, Amphibian) on 1 March 1935
 Redesignated 88th Reconnaissance Squadron on 1 September 1936
 Redesignated 88th Reconnaissance Squadron (Long Range) on 6 December 1939
 Redesignated 88th Reconnaissance Squadron (Heavy) on 20 November 1940
 Redesignated 436th Bombardment Squadron (Heavy) on 22 April 1942
 Redesignated 436th Bombardment Squadron, Heavy on 3 July 1943
 Inactivated on 6 January 1946
 Redesignated 436th Bombardment Squadron, Very Heavy on 1 October 1946
 Activated on 1 October 1946
 Redesignated 436th Bombardment Squadron (Heavy) on 20 July 1948
 Discontinued and inactivated on 1 April 1963>
 Redesignated 436th Strategic Training Squadron on 14 February 1986
 Activated on 1 July 1986
 Redesignated 436th Training Squadron on 1 June 1992

Assignments

 Post Headquarters, Kelly Field, 18 August-11 October 1917
 Aviation Concentration Center, 11–27 October 1917
 American Expeditionary Forces, 9–16 November 1917
 1st Air Depot, 16 November 1917
 1st Observation Group School, 1 February-28 May 1918
 I Corps Observation Group, 28 May 1918
 III Corps Observation Group, 4 August 1918 9attached to V Corps Observation Group, 12–17 September 1918)
 VII Corps Observation Group, 29 November 1918
 American Expeditionary Forces, 1–10 June 1919
 Post Headquarters, Mitchell Field, 27 June 1919
 Post Headquarters, Scott Field, 11 July 1919
 2d Wing, 5 September 1919 (attached to 1st Army Observation Group), October 1919
 lst Army Observation Group (later 7th Bombardment Group), 24 March 1920 – 9 February 1921
 Air Service Field Officer's School, 10 February 1921 – 14 October 1921 (attached to 1st Provisional Air Brigade for operations, 6 May–3 October 1921)

 Fifth Corps Area 15 October 1921 – 30 April 1927
 Air Corps Training Center 1 May–1 August 1927
 Eighth Corps Area 1 June 1928 – 29 June 1931 (attached to Field Artillery School, November 19310
 12th Observation Group 30 June 1931 – 31 August 1936
 7th Bombardment Group 1 September 1936 – 6 January 1946 (air echelon attached to 31st Bombardment Squadron, 10 December 1941 – 8 February 1942; United States Navy, until 14 March 1942)
 7th Bombardment Group, 1 October 1946 – 15 June 1952 9attached to 7th Bombardment Wing after 14 February 1951)
 7th Bombardment Wing 16 June 1952
 4238th Strategic Wing 1 August 1958 – 1 April 1963
 Strategic Air Command 1 July 1986
 Air Combat Command, 1 June 1992
 7th Bomb Wing 1 October 1993 – 30 June 1994
 7th Operations Group 1 July 1994 –30 Sep 2015
 552nd Operations Group, 30 Sep 2015 –17 Aug 2018
 552nd Training Group, 17 Aug 2018 – Present

Stations

 Kelly Field, Texas, 18 August 1917
 Aviation Concentration Center, Garden City, New York, 11–27 October 1917
 Overseas transport: RMS Orduna, 27 October-11 November 1917
 Colombey-les-Belles Airdrome, France, 16 November 1917
 Amanty Airdrome, France, 1 February 1918
 Ourches Aerodrome, France, 28 May 1918
 Francheville Aerodrome, France, 7 July 1918
 Ferme des Greves Aerodrome, France, 4 August 1918
 Goussancourt Airdrome, France, 4 September 1918
 Ferme des Greves Aerodrome, France, 9 September 1918
 Souilly Aerodrome, France, 12 September 1918
 Pretz-en-Argonne Airdrome, France, 14 September 1918
 Souilly Aerodrome, France, 20 September 1918
 Bethelainville Aerodrome, France, 4 November 1918
 Villers-la-Chevre Aerodrome, France, 29 November 1918
 Trier Airfield, Germany, 6 December 1918
 Le Mans, France, 1–10 June 1919
 Mitchel Field, New York, 27 June 1919
 Scott Field, Illinois, 1 July 1919
 Langley Field, Virginia, 5 September 1919 (operated from Charleston, West Virginia, 3–8 September 1921, detachment remained at Charleston until October 1921)
 Godman Field, Kentucky, 15 October 1921
 Wilbur Wright Field, Ohio, 11 October 1922
 Brooks Field, Texas, 7 May – 1 August 1927
 Post Field, Oklahoma, 1 June 1928
 Brooks Field, Texas, 5 November 1931

 Hamilton Field, California, 28 September 1935
 Fort Douglas, Utah, 7 September 1940
 Salt Lake City Army Air Base, Utah, c. 15 January – 11 November 1941
 Archerfield Airport, Australia, 22 December 1941 – 4 February 1942 (air echelon operated from: Hickam Field, Hawaii, 7 December 1941 – 10 February 19420; Nandi Airport, Fiji Islands, 12–17 February 1942; RAAF Base Townsville, Australia, 20 February – c. 14 March 1942
 Karachi, India, 12 March 1942
 Allahabad, India, 1 June 1942
 Gaya, India, 14 November 1942
 Bishnupur, India, 25 February 1943
 Panagarh, India, 25 September 1943
 Madhaiganj, India, 13 December 1943
 Tezgaon, India, 14 June 1944
 Madhaiganj, India, 6 October 1944 (detachment based at Luliang, China, December 1944 – January 1945)
 Tezpur, India, 1 June – 7 December 1945
 Camp Kilmer, New Jersey, 5–6 January 1946
 Ft Worth Army Air Fiel1d (later Carswell Air Force Base), Texas, 1 October 1946
 Barksdale Air Force Base, Louisiana, 1 August 1958 – 1 April 1963
 Carswell Air Force Base, Texas 1 July 1986
 Dyess Air Force Base, Texas 5 March 1993 – present

Aircraft

 Avion de Reconnaissance 1 and 2 (AR 1 AR 2), 1918
 Sopwith 1½ Strutter, 1918
 Salmson 2A2, 1918–1919
 Dayton-Wright DH-4, 1919–1921
 Douglas O-2, 1919–1930
 In addition to 0–19, 1930–1935
 Included 0–31 and C-1 during period 1930–1933
 0–43, 1934–1935
 In addition to 0–35, 1935–1937, and B-12, 1936-c. 1937

 Included 0–27, OA-4, Y1OA-8, B-7, and B-10 during period 1935–1938
 B-18, 1937–1940
 B-17, 1939–1942
 B-24, 1942–1945
 B-29, 1946–1948
 B-36, 1948–1958
 XC-99, 1949 (SN 43-52436) – Administered Test Flight Program
 B-52 1958–1963

See also

 List of American aero squadrons
 List of B-29 Superfortress operators
 List of B-52 Units of the United States Air Force
 United States Army Air Forces in Australia

References

Notes
 Explanatory notes

 Citations

Bibliography

 
 
 
 
 
 

0436
Military units and formations in Texas